1493 Sigrid, provisional designation , is a dark Nysian asteroid from the inner regions of the asteroid belt, approximately 24 kilometers in diameter. It was discovered on 26 August 1938, by Belgian astronomer Eugène Delporte at the Royal Observatory of Belgium in Uccle. It was named after Sigrid Strömgren, wife of astronomer Bengt Strömgren.

Orbit and classification 

Sigrid is a member of the Nysa family, the largest asteroid family of the main belt, consisting of stony and carbonaceous subfamilies. The family, named after 44 Nysa, is located in the inner belt near the Kirkwood gap (3:1 orbital resonance with Jupiter), a depleted zone that separates the central main belt.

It orbits the Sun in the inner main-belt at a distance of 1.9–2.9 AU once every 3 years and 9 months (1,383 days). Its orbit has an eccentricity of 0.20 and an inclination of 3° with respect to the ecliptic. The body's observation arc begins with its official discovery observation at Uccle in August 1938.

Physical characteristics

Spectral type 

In the Tholen classification, Sigrid is an F-type asteroid (which agrees with the overall spectral type of the Polanian subgroup). In the SMASS classification, it is a Xc-subtype, which transitions between the X- and C-type asteroids. It has also been characterized as a primitive P-type asteroid by the Wide-field Infrared Survey Explorer (WISE).

Photometry

Rotation period an amplitude 

In August 2006, a rotational lightcurve of Sigrid was obtained from photometric observations at the Mount Tarana and Cecil Observatory in NSW, Australia. Lightcurve analysis gave a rotation period of 43.296 hours with a brightness variation of 0.6 magnitude. In October 2010, Raymond Poncy found a period of 22.68 hours (or half the previous period solution) and an amplitude of 0.38 magnitude. While not being a slow rotator, the body's period is significantly longer than the typical 2 to 20 hours seen among the majority of asteroids.

Spin axis 

The asteroids lightcurve has also been modeled, using photometric data from the Lowell Photometric Database (LPD) and other sources. Modelling gave a concurring period of 43.179 and 43.1795 hours, as well as two spin axis of (183.0°, 69°) and (350.0°, 69°) in ecliptic coordinates (λ, β).

Diameter and albedo 

According to the surveys carried out by the Infrared Astronomical Satellite IRAS, the Japanese Akari satellite and the NEOWISE mission of NASA's WISE telescope, Sigrid measures between 22.111 and 28.905 kilometers in diameter and its surface has a low albedo between 0.034 and 0.05.

The Collaborative Asteroid Lightcurve Link adopts the results obtained by IRAS, that is an albedo of 0.0489 and a diameter of 24.03 kilometers based on an absolute magnitude of 11.99.

Naming 

This minor planet was named after Sigrid Strömgren, wife of the Danish-American astronomer Bengt Strömgren, after whom the asteroid 1846 Bengt was named. The official naming citation was mentioned in The Names of the Minor Planets by Paul Herget in 1955.

References

External links 
 Asteroid Lightcurve Database (LCDB), query form (info )
 Dictionary of Minor Planet Names, Google books
 Asteroids and comets rotation curves, CdR – Observatoire de Genève, Raoul Behrend
 Discovery Circumstances: Numbered Minor Planets (1)-(5000) – Minor Planet Center
 
 

001493
Discoveries by Eugène Joseph Delporte
Named minor planets
001493
001493
19380826